Quality Street is a line of tinned and boxed toffees, chocolates and sweets, first manufactured by Mackintosh's in Halifax, West Yorkshire, England, in 1936. It was named after J. M. Barrie's play Quality Street. Since 1988 they have been produced by Nestlé. Quality Street have long been a competitor to Cadbury Roses which were launched by Cadbury in 1938.

History 
In 1890 John Mackintosh and his wife opened a shop in Halifax, West Yorkshire, England where they created a new kind of sweet by mixing hard toffee with runny caramel.  These toffees were made from inexpensive local ingredients such as milk, sugar beets and eggs. They were so successful that in 1898 they expanded the operation to build the world's first toffee factory.  It burned down in 1909, so John bought an old carpet factory and converted it into a new facility.  When John Mackintosh died, his son Harold inherited the business and in 1936 he invented Quality Street. The name was inspired by a play of the same name by J. M. Barrie.

In the early 1930s, only the wealthy could afford boxed chocolates made from exotic ingredients from around the world with elaborate packaging that often cost as much as the chocolates themselves.  Harold Mackintosh set out to produce boxes of chocolates that could be sold at a reasonable price and would, therefore, be available to working-class families.  His idea was to cover the different toffees with chocolate and present them in low-cost yet attractive boxes.

Rather than having each piece separated in the box, which would require more costly packaging, Mackintosh decided to have each piece individually wrapped in coloured paper and put into a decorative tin.  He also introduced new technology, the world's first twist-wrapping machine, to wrap each chocolate in a distinctive wrapper.  By using a tin, instead of a cardboard box, Mackintosh ensured the chocolate aroma burst out as soon as it was opened and the different textures, colours, shapes and sizes of the sweets made opening the tin and consuming its contents a noisy, vibrant experience that the whole family could enjoy.

In the later 1930s, Britain was still feeling the effects of the economic crash and Mackintosh realised that in times of economic hardship and war, people crave nostalgia. Quality Street chocolates were, therefore, packaged in brightly coloured tins featuring two characters wearing Regency era dress, known affectionately as Miss Sweetly and Major Quality, inspired by the principal characters from J.M. Barrie's play. They featured on all Quality Street boxes and tins until 2000.  The original models for the pair were Tony and Iris Coles, the children of Sydney Coles who designed the advertising campaign that first appeared on a front-page newspaper advertisement in the Daily Mail on 2 May 1936.

The brand was acquired by Nestlé when they bought Rowntree Mackintosh in 1988.

Individual larger versions of the more popular chocolates are now manufactured and sold separately, as an extension to the brand, such as a bar based on the Purple One.

In Western Norway, Quality Street is called "Shetlandsgodt" or more commonly "Shetland Snoops" (Shetland Sweets), because it often was brought home by fishermen visiting Shetland. In Iceland it is traditionally known as "Mackintosh".

Quality Street gained the implied endorsement of Saddam Hussein when the Iraqi leader was reported to have offered them to visiting British politician George Galloway in 2002. Nestlé were initially positive, but then chose to backtrack about the connection.

Contents 

The sweets within the box have changed and evolved over the years. As of September 2019, there are 15 flavours (including the Fruit Cremes box exclusive, John Lewis exclusive, and Matchmakers) of the individually wrapped sweets, all of which are either chocolate or toffee based, as follows:

Current varieties

In tin 

"The Purple One" (previously known as Hazel in Caramel) – Milk Chocolate filled with hazelnut and caramel (purple wrapper)
"The Green Triangle" (previously known as Noisette Triangle) – milk chocolate filled with hazelnut praline (green wrapper, foil)
Toffee Finger (gold wrapper, stick)
Strawberry Delight (red wrapper, circular)
Caramel Swirl (yellow wrapper, circular, foil)
Milk Choc Block (green wrapper)
Orange Chocolate Crunch (orange wrapper, octagonal, foil)
Orange Creme (orange wrapper)
Fudge (pink wrapper)
Coconut Eclair (blue wrapper)
Toffee Penny (gold wrapper, circular, no chocolate coating)

The Toffee Penny wrapper presented a challenge for a number of years because, unlike in the case of the relatively shelf-stable chocolate, the cellophane wrapper would stick to the toffee confection over time due to its hygroscopic properties. Following a suggestion by packaging manufacturer William T. Robson OBE, a new barrier material of foil backed paper was adopted by Mackintosh to overcome the problem in 1967. 'Robson Wrap' was a huge success and became a signature of the brand after being rolled out in one variation or another to several different flavours.

Sold separately

Lemon Zing (yellow wrapper, fruit cremes box only or in 2022 Spring Edition pouch)
Matchmakers (sold separately as Cool Mint, Zingy Orange, Yummy Honeycomb, Salted Caramel, Gingerbread and Maple & Pecan)
Intrigue Truffles sold separately as Praline, Salted Caramel and Orange (Salted Caramel and Praline are sold at both  Asda and Morrison's stores, whereas Orange is sold at Asda only)

On 15 August 2013, the My Green Bar became available from Nestlé, which consisted of four original green noisette pâté triangles held together by milk chocolate. This was also available in My Purple Bar.

Discontinued varieties 

 Purple One (the original 'Purple One' with Brazil nut, replaced with hazelnut version)
 Chocolate Strawberry Cream (now replaced with Strawberry Delight)
 Chocolate Toffee Cup (now replaced with Caramel Swirl)
 Hazelnut Cracknell (red wrapper)
 Hazelnut Éclair 
 Honeycomb crunch (Discontinued in 2018 to re-introduce Toffee Deluxe)
 Chocolate Nut Toffee Cream
 Malt Toffee (replaced with Toffee Deluxe as a "new" flavour)
 Milk Chocolate Round (now replaced with Milk Choc Block in green wrapper)
 Peanut Cracknell (blue wrapper)
 Almond Octagon (purple wrapper, replaced with Vanilla Octagon, but the latter is now discontinued as well)
 Gooseberry Cream (green wrapper light green fondant with a touch of Gooseberry Preserve covered in milk chocolate)
 Fig Fancy (light brown wrapper)
 Apricot Delight (blue wrapper, square chunk, apricot flavoured jelly covered in milk chocolate)
 Toffee Square (metallic pink wrapper, a small square of very hard toffee)
 Chocolate Truffle (brown square chunk, a soft truffle filling covered in milk chocolate)
 Montelimar Nougat
 Harrogate Toffee
 Fruits of the Forest Creme (pale purple wrapper)
 Smarties (ordinary cardboard box of Smarties, a 2004 promotion only)
 Coffee Cream (brown wrapper, same size and shape as the strawberry cream)
 Mint Fondant (pale green wrapper, same as strawberry crème but with a mint crème filling)
Toffee Deluxe (replaced by Honeycomb Crunch, reintroduced and then replaced by Chocolate Caramel Brownie)
Crispy Truffle Bite (John Lewis stores only, black and gold recyclable foil)
Chocolate Caramel Brownie (cyan wrapper) Discontinued in 2021.

See also 
Heroes (confectionery) 
Cadbury Roses
Celebrations (confectionery)
Quality Street (play)

References

External links

 
 Breakdown of sweets inside a typical Quality Street tub
 The Chocolate Reviews article on Quality Street
 Quality Street Tins – Reference Site

Rowntree's brands
Nestlé brands
British confectionery
Yorkshire cuisine
Products introduced in 1936